Myrmecophilus nebrascensis, the Nebraska ant cricket, is a species of ant cricket in the family Myrmecophilidae. It is found in North America.

References

Crickets
Articles created by Qbugbot
Insects described in 1898